19th Avenue/Camelback is a station on the Metro light rail line in Uptown Phoenix, Arizona, United States. A park and ride lot is adjacent to the station on the south side of Camelback Road.

Station art
The 19th Avenue/Camelback station features art by Josh Garber:

"This landmark is approximately 30 feet tall, with an aluminum “skin” on the outside made from cut segments of aluminum bars. Fiber optic lights under the skin transform the sculpture into an inviting beacon at night.

Ridership

References

External links
 Valley Metro map

Valley Metro Rail stations in Phoenix, Arizona
Railway stations in the United States opened in 2008
2008 establishments in Arizona